The list of naval weapon systems aims to provide reference about weapons mounted on surface combatant warships, and smaller craft and submarines found throughout the history of naval warfare. The list is sorted alpha-numerically by system service designation (i.e. Mk 15), or issue name if designation is unknown:
NB: As this is an English language list, NATO codenames are used preferentially. Glossary of abbreviations at bottom.

0-9

40/60 Gun
40/70 Gun
53-39 AntiShip Torpedo
53-51 AntiShip Torpedo
53-56 AntiShip Torpedo
53-57 AntiShip Torpedo
53-61 AntiShip Torpedo
53-65 AntiShip Torpedo
65-73 AntiShip Torpedo
65-76 AntiShip Torpedo

A
Advanced Light Torpedo Shyena
AK-130 130 mm Gun
AK-100 100 mm Gun
AK–176 76.2 mm Gun
AK-230 twin 30mm Gun
AK-630 Gun 
Ak-725 57 mm Gun
Albatros SAM
AM-39 Exocet ASM
APR-2 Airborne ASW Missile
APR-3 Airborne ASW Missile
Aspide SAM
ASROC
Aster SAM

B
Barak 1 point defense missile system
Barak 8 area defense missile system
Bar’er-vk 
BGM-109 Tomahawk Cruise Missile
BL 13.5 inch Mk V naval gun
BL 14 inch Mk VII naval gun
BL 15 inch Mk I naval gun
BL 16 inch Mk I naval gun
BL 18 inch / 40 naval gun
BL 6 inch Mk VII naval gun
Bofors 40 mm gun
BrahMos Supersonic cruise missile
BrahMos-II Hypersonic cruise missile

C
Crotale SAM

D
Dealer torpedo
Dhanush Shipborne anti-ship/land attack ballistic missile
DRDO Naval Anti-Ship Missile Short Range (NASM-SR)
DRDO Naval Anti-Ship Missile Extended Range (NASM-ER)
DRDO Takshak torpedo

E
Exocet

F
F17 Torpedo

G
Gabriel SSM
Goalkeeper CIWS
Gökdeniz
Guided Weapon System 1 
Guided Weapon System 2 
Guided Weapon System 21 
Guided Weapon System 22 
Guided Weapon System 23 
Guided Weapon System 24 
Guided Weapon System 25 
Guided Weapon System 26 
Guided Weapon System 30

H
Hedgehog
HF-1 Hsiung Feng I SSM
HF-2 Hsiung Feng II SSM
HF-3 Hsiung Feng III SSM

I
Ikara SUM

J
JL-2 SLBM

K
K-15 nuclear-capable short range Submarine-launched ballistic missile (SLBM)
K-4 nuclear-capable intermediate-range SLBM
K-5 nuclear-capable intermediate-range SLBM
K-6 nuclear-capable intercontinental-range SLBM
 K-ASROC (Hong Sang Eo (Red Shark) rocket-based torpedo)
 K731 HW White Shark torpedo
 K745 LW Blue Shark torpedo

L
Limbo

M
M-4 SLBM
M45 SLBM
M51 SLBM
Manta Mine
Mattress
MM-38 Exocet SSM 
MM-40 Exocet SSM
Modele 53 100mm Gun
Modele 64 100mm Gun
Modele 68 CADAM 100mm Gun
Modele 100 TR 100mm Gun
MU90 Impact Torpedo
 Mk 1 Terrier Missile launcher USS Mississippi
 Mk 4 Triple 14"/50 Gun
 Mk 4 Terrier Missile launcher
 Mk 5 Twin 16"/45 Gun
 Mk 5 Terrier Missile launcher
 Mk 6 Triple 16"/45 Gun
 Mk 7 Triple 16"/50 Gun
 Mk 7 Talos Missile launcher
 Mk 8 Triple 12"/50 Gun
 Mk 9 Terrier Missile launcher
 Mk 8 Torpedo
 Mk 10 Terrier Missile launcher
 Mk 11 Tartar Missile launcher
 Mk 12 Talos Missile launcher
 Mk 13 Missile Launcher
 Mk 14 torpedo
 Mk 15 torpedo
 Mk 15 Phalanx CIWS 
 Mk 16 5 inch DP (Dual Purpose) Gun
 Mk 16 ASROC Launcher
 Mk 19 Grenade launcher
 Mk 22 3 inch Gun
 Mk 22 Missile Launcher
 Mk 24 Tigerfish Torpedo
 Mk 25 Sea Sparrow launcher
 Mk 26 3"/70 DP (Dual Purpose) Gun
 Mk 26 Missile Launcher
 Mk 27 target torpedo
 Mk 29 NATO Sea Sparrow launcher
 Mk 30 target torpedo
 Mk 32 SVTT (Surface Vessel Torpedo Tubes)
 Mk 33 3"/50 DP (Dual Purpose) Gun
 Mk 36 SRBOC (Super Rapid Blooming Offboard Countermeasure)
 Mk 37 Torpedo
 Mk 38 Chain Gun
 Mk 38 Mod 1 Machine Gun
 Mk 38 Mod 2 Stabilized Machine Gun
 Mk 41 VLS (Vertical Launch System)
 Mk 42 5 inch DP (Dual Purpose) Gun
 Mk 44 Torpedo
 Mk 45 5 inch DP (Dual Purpose) Gun
 Mk 46 Torpedo
 Mk 48 Torpedo
 Mk 50 Torpedo
 Mark 54 Torpedo
 Mark 56 GFCS
 Mark 63 GFCS
 Mk 74 FCS
 Mk 75 Oto Melara 76mm Compact Gun
 Mk 68 GFCS
 Mk 72 Mod 0 sonar system
 Mk 84 sonar system
 Mk 86 Gun FCS (Fire Control System)
 Mk 91 FCS
 MK 92 FCS
 Mk 114 ASW FCS
 Mk 116 ASW FCS
 Mk 112 ASROC Launcher
 Mk 141 Quad Harpoon Launcher
 Mk 143 Quad Tomahawk Box Launcher

N
Nirbhay long range subsonic anti-ship/land attack cruise missile
Nulka Active Missile Decoy
Naval Strike Missile

O
Otomat SSM

P
PAAMS NCS
Penguin SSM
Phalanx CIWS
Polaris missile

Q
QF 1 pounder pom-pom
QF 12 pounder 12 cwt naval gun
QF 12 pounder 18 cwt naval gun
QF 14 pounder Maxim-Nordenfelt naval gun
QF 2 pounder naval gun
QF 3 pounder Hotchkiss
QF 3 pounder Vickers
QF 3 inch Mark N1 gun
QF 4 inch Mk V gun
QF 4.5 inch naval gun
QF 4.7 inch Gun Mk I - IV
QF 5.25 inch Mark I naval gun
QF 6 inch Mk I - III naval gun
QF 6 pounder Hotchkiss
QF 6 inch Mark N5 gun

R
RAT-52 antiship torpedo
RGM-6 Regulus SSM
RGM-15 Regulus II SSM
RGM-59 Taurus SSM
RGM-165 LASM SSM
RGM-84 Harpoon SSM
RIM-2 Terrier SAM
RIM-7 Sea Sparrow PDMS 
RIM-8 Talos
RIM-24 Tartar SAM
RIM-50 Typhon LR SAM
RIM-55 Typhon MR SAM
RIM-66 SM-1MR Standard Medium Range SAM 
RIM-66 SM-1ER Standard Extended Range SAM
RIM-67 SM-2MR Standard Medium Range SAM
RIM-67 SM-2ER Standard Extended Range SAM
RIM-116 Rolling Airframe Missile SAM
RIM-156 SM-2ER Block IV SAM
RIM-161 SM-3 SAM
RIM-162 ESSM (Evolved Sea Sparrow Missile) SAM
RPK-8 Antisubmarine Rocket System
RUR-4
RUM-139 VL ASROC
RUR-5 ASROC

S
SA-N-1 Goa SAM
SA-N-2 Guideline SAM
SA-N-3 Goblet SAM
SA-N-4 Gecko SAM
SA-N-5 Grail SAM
SA-N-6 Grumble SAM
SA-N-7 Gadfly SAM
SA-N-8 Gremlin SAM
SA-N-9 Gauntlet SAM
SA-N-10 Grouse SAM
SA-N-11 Grisom SAM
SA-N-12 Grizzly SAM
Sea Cat SAM
Sea Dart missile SAM
SAET-50 Anti-Ship Torpedo
SAET-60 Anti-Ship Torpedo
Sea Gnat Decoy
Sea Slug SAM
Sea Wolf SAM
SET-40 antisubmarine torpedo
SET-53 antisubmarine torpedo
SET-65 antisubmarine torpedo
SET-72 antisubmarine torpedo
Squid
SMART system (Supersonic Missile Assisted Release of Torpedo (SMART) system)
SM-4 SAM
SM-39 Exocet USM
Spearfish Torpedo
SS-N-1 Scrubber SSM
SS-N-2 Styx SSM
SS-N-3 Sepal/Shaddock SSM
SS-N-4 Sark SLBM
SS-N-5 Serb SLBM
SS-N-6 Serb SLBM
SS-N-7 Starbright SSM
SS-N-8 Sawfly SLBM
SS-N-9 Siren SSM
SS-N-12 Sandbox SSM
SS-N-14 Silex SUM
SS-N-15 Starfish SSM
SS-N-16 Stallion SSM
SS-N-17 Snipe SLBM
SS-N-18 Stingray SLBM
SS-N-19 Shipwreck SSM
SS-N-20 Sturgeon SLBM
SS-N-21 Sampson SSM
SS-N-22 Sunburn SSM
SS-N-23 Skiff SLBM
SS-N-24 Scorpion SSM
SS-N-25 Switchblade SSM
Sting Ray torpedo
SUBROC

T
TEST71 Torpedo
TP 61 Torpedo
TP 613 Torpedo
TP 617 Torpedo
TP 62 Torpedo
TP 2000 Torpedo
Trident missile
Type 53 torpedo
Type 65 torpedo
Type 91 torpedo
Type 92 torpedo
Type 93 torpedo
Type 95 torpedo
Type 97 torpedo

U
UGM-27 Polaris SLBM
UGM-73 Poseidon SLBM
UGM-84 Sub-Harpoon USM
UGM-93 Trident SLBM 
UGM-133 Trident II SLBM
UMGT-1 Torpedo antisubmarine torpedo
USET-80 Torpedo 
UUM-44 SUBROC UUM

V
VA-111 Shkval Torpedo
Varunastra (torpedo) heavy weight torpedo
VL-SRSAM short/medium range quick reaction surface-to-air missile based on Astra (missile)
VL MICA naval version of MICA (missile)

W
Weapon Alpha

X

Y

Z

Glossary 

ASM - Anti-Ship Missile
CIWS - Close In Weapon System
FCS - Fire Control System
GFCS - Gun FCS
NCS - Naval Combat System
PDMS - Point Defence Missile System
SAM - Surface to Air Missile
SA-N - Surface to Air Missile (Naval)
SLBM - Submarine Launched Ballistic Missile
SSM - Surface to Surface Missile
SUM - Surface to Underwater Missile
USM - Undersurface to Surface Missile
UUM - Undersurface to Undersurface Missile

See also
List of naval guns

References

External links
Naval Weapons

Naval warfare
Naval weapons